Ana Sacerdote (25 September 1925 – 2019) was an Italian-born Argentine abstract artist who lived in Buenos Aires.

Sacerdote was born in Rome, Italy on 25 September 1925. She graduated from the Escuela Nacional de Bellas Artes Prilidiano Pueyrredon in Buenos Aires and studied under Lino Enea Spilimbergo. In the mid-1950s, she exhibited with Carmelo Arden Quin, Martin Blaszko, Gregorio Vardanega, Virgilio Villalba, Luis Tomasello, and others in the Asociacion Arte Nuevo in Buenos Aires, which was organized by Aldo Pellegrini. In 1956, with recommendations from Jorge Romero Brest and Pablo Curatella Manes, Sacerdote was awarded a grant by the French government to live and study in Paris. She continued painting throughout the 1960s, when she became interested in video art and later computer-generated drawings. She created an animated film based on her geometric paintings that was shown at the I Festival Internacional do Cinema de Animação no Brasil VIII Bienal de São Paulo in São Paulo, Brazil in 1965. Beginning in the 1970s, she experimented with computer-generated drawings and continued to create video art. Sacerdote died in 2019.

Publications

References

External links
 Ana Sacerdote

1925 births
2019 deaths
20th-century Argentine women artists
21st-century Argentine women artists
Argentine video artists
Artists from Buenos Aires
Artists from Rome
Italian emigrants to Argentina